North Pembroke is a census-designated place (CDP) in the town of Pembroke in Plymouth County, Massachusetts, United States. The population was 3,292 at the 2010 census.

Geography
North Pembroke is located at  (42.095518, -70.777921).

According to the United States Census Bureau, the CDP has a total area of 11.4 km (4.4 mi), all land.

Demographics

At the 2000 census there were 2,913 people in 1,000 households, including 761 families, in the CDP. The population density was 255.6/km (661.8/mi). There were 1,013 housing units at an average density of 88.9/km (230.1/mi).  The racial makeup of the CDP was 97.12% White, 0.45% African American, 1.00% Asian, 0.41% from other races, and 1.03% from two or more races. Hispanic or Latino of any race were 0.72%.

Of the 1,000 households 40.2% had children under the age of 18 living with them, 64.6% were married couples living together, 7.4% had a female householder with no husband present, and 23.8% were non-families. 19.2% of households were one person and 6.2% were one person aged 65 or older. The average household size was 2.85 and the average family size was 3.32.

The age distribution was 29.4% under the age of 18, 6.0% from 18 to 24, 32.0% from 25 to 44, 23.9% from 45 to 64, and 8.7% 65 or older. The median age was 35 years. For every 100 females, there were 102.3 males. For every 100 females age 18 and over, there were 96.7 males.

The median household income was $73,542 and the median family income was $78,635. Males had a median income of $55,938 versus $38,190 for females. The per capita income for the CDP was $33,093. About 4.9% of families and 5.7% of the population were below the poverty line, including 6.5% of those under age 18 and 12.7% of those age 65 or over.

References

Census-designated places in Plymouth County, Massachusetts
Pembroke, Massachusetts
Census-designated places in Massachusetts